Set-jetting (or taking a location vacation) is the trend of traveling to destinations that were the filming locations of movies.  Examples include touring London in a high-speed boat as in the James Bond films, or visiting the stately homes that are seen in the Jane Austen adaptations. The term is a play on jet-setting, a form of luxury travel in upper-class society.

The term was first coined in the US press in the New York Post by journalist Gretchen Kelly in 2008. An analysis of the use of Geospatial technologies in set jetting was proposed by Thierry Joliveau in The Cartographic Journal. Corporations, convention and tourism boards followed the trend that year, creating their own set-jetting travel maps, like the Elizabeth: The Golden Age movie map published by VisitBritain.

In June 2018, Maya Beach, made famous by Danny Boyle's 2000 film The Beach, was closed indefinitely to allow it to recover from the ecological damage of mass tourism. The beach received up to 5,000 tourists and 200 boats a day.

References

Film
Types of tourism